David Grigoryan may refer to:
 David Grigoryan (footballer, born 1982), Armenian football defender
 David G. Grigoryan, Armenian football midfielder
 David Grigoryan (serviceman), Armenian servicemen